The Men's 1989 European Amateur Boxing Championships were held in Athens, Greece from May 29 to June 3, with the participation of 160 fighters from 26 countries. The 28th edition of the bi-annual competition was organised by the European governing body for amateur boxing, EABA.

Medal winners

Medal table

External links
Results
EABA Boxing
Amateur Boxing

European Amateur Boxing Championships
Boxing
European Amateur Boxing Championships
B
Boxing in Greece
European Amateur Boxing Championships
European Amateur Boxing Championships
Sports competitions in Athens
European Amateur Boxing Championships